Maha Muhammad Abdalsalam Gouda (born June 8, 1998) is an Egyptian Olympic diver. She represented Egypt at 2016 Summer Olympics in Rio de Janeiro. She qualified to represent Egypt again at the 2020 Summer Olympics in the Women's 10 metre platform event.

Olympic participation

Rio de Janeiro 2016 
 Diving – Women's 10 metre platform

References

External links
 
 FIU Panthers bio

1998 births
Egyptian female divers
Olympic divers of Egypt
Divers at the 2016 Summer Olympics
Living people
Divers at the 2020 Summer Olympics
Sportspeople from Alexandria
Divers at the 2014 Summer Youth Olympics
FIU Panthers women's divers
20th-century Egyptian women
21st-century Egyptian women